William L. Beers (August 17, 1904 – January 14, 1955) was an American politician who served as the Attorney General of Connecticut from 1953 to 1955.

He died on January 14, 1955, in New Haven, Connecticut at age 50.

References

1904 births
1955 deaths
Connecticut Attorneys General
Connecticut Republicans